James Richard Studdert Redmayne (born 16 July 1979) is an English former first-class cricketer.

Life

Cricket 
The son of Richard Redmayne, who is a businessman in corporate finance, and Patricia (née Burke), who runs a relocation business, he was born at Westminster in July 1979. He was educated at Eton College, before going up to Trinity College, Oxford. While studying at Oxford, Redmayne played first-class cricket. He made his debut for a combined Oxford Universities team against Gloucestershire at Bristol in 2000. He made two further first-class appearances for Oxford Universities in 2000, in addition to playing for Oxford University against Cambridge University in that years University Match. He didn't feature in first-class cricket in 2001, but did play twice in 2002, making an appearance each for Oxford UCCE against Northamptonshire, and for Oxford in The University Match. In six first-class matches, Redmayne scored 245 runs at an average of 30.62, with a high score of 75 not out.

Personal life 
After graduating from Oxford, Redmayne was employed as an investment banker for Goldman Sachs in London. He joined CVC Capital Partners in 2005, holding a number of positions within the company in London and then Hong Kong, where he was employed most recently as a senior managing director. He joined Searchlight Capital in June 2020. 

His brother is the actor Eddie Redmayne, while his paternal great-grandfather was Sir Richard Redmayne, a civil and mining engineer.

Notes and references

External links

 

1979 births
Living people
People from Westminster
People educated at Eton College
Alumni of Trinity College, Oxford
English cricketers
Oxford University cricketers
Oxford Universities cricketers
Oxford MCCU cricketers
English investment bankers
English expatriates in Hong Kong
James